Quynh Anh Pham (born 16 January 1987 in Liège, Belgium) is a Vietnamese-Belgian singer.

Singing career

From the early age, Quynh Anh participated in numerous music activities in Mons. In September 2000, her father enrolled her in the TV singing competition "Pour la Gloire" (For the Glory) held by Belgium TV channel RTBF, where she won the first prize. Through this competition, she met her new manager, who introduced Quynh Anh to her producer. In 2002 she signed a contract with Rapas Centre, a French-branch of Universal. The producer made possible Quynh Anh's duet "J'espère" with French-hit singer Marc Lavoine in 2005. Quynh Anh then followed Lavoine on a tour to France, Switzerland, and Belgium.

Quynh Anh reached international popularity in 2006 with her French song "Bonjour Vietnam" composed by Lavoine and co-written by Lavoine and Yvan Coriat. Lavoine said he was touched by the innocent charm and the longing of a small girl who had never seen her homeland. Later, Quynh Anh worked with her producer Pierre-Alain Simon to release her first album "Bonjour Vietnam". Due to its popularity, "Bonjour Vietnam" was translated into English by Guy Balbaert and was called "Hello Vietnam" (distinguish it from the single "Hello Vietnam" written by Tom T. Hall and recorded by American country music singer Johnnie Wright in 1965). In May 2008, Quynh Anh performed "Hello Vietnam" in Paris by Night 92 show by Thúy Nga Productions. The song was even used by Vietjet as background music while embarking from the plane.

Discography

Album
 Bonjour Vietnam

Singles
 2005: J'espère (duet with Marc Lavoine)
 2006: Bonjour Vietnam
 2008: Hello Vietnam
 2010: I Say Gold

References

External links
 Hello Vietnam - Quynh Anh

1987 births
French pop singers
Living people
Anh, Quynh
Belgian people of Vietnamese descent
21st-century French singers
21st-century French women singers
21st-century Belgian singers